Lipa may refer to the following people
Given name
Lipa Schmeltzer (born 1978), American Hassidic entertainer

Surname
Andreas Lipa (born 1971), Austrian football manager and former footballer
Dua Lipa (born 1995), English-Albanian singer, songwriter and model
Elisabeta Lipă (born 1964), Romanian rower and government official
Joe Lipa, Philippine basketball coach
Mateusz Lipa (born 1994), Polish racing cyclist
Peter Lipa (born 1943), Slovak singer, composer and promoter of jazz
Shaily Lipa (born 1974), Israeli cookbook author
Stefan Lipa (born 1953), New Zealand politician